FIFA Football 2005, also known as FIFA Soccer 2005 in North America or simply FIFA 2005, is a football simulation video game released in 2004. It was developed by EA Canada and published by Electronic Arts. It was released for the PlayStation, PlayStation 2, Microsoft Windows, Xbox, PlayStation Portable (as simply FIFA Soccer), GameCube, mobile phone, Gizmondo, N-Gage and the Game Boy Advance. The tagline for the game was: "A great player needs a great first touch". FIFA 2005 is the twelfth game in the FIFA series, the ninth in 3D and the final game in the series for the PlayStation. FIFA Football 2005 marks the first time to include the seventh-generation handheld game consoles. The Japanese version of the game went by the name of FIFA Total Football 2 and was released on 9 December 2004. FIFA Football 2005 is the last licensed game to be released for the PlayStation in North America.

Gameplay
Improving the career mode, the game was extensively advertised and released much sooner than the usual late October dates to avoid proximity with the release of Pro Evolution Soccer 4 and the EA Big release FIFA Street.

The game featured a return of create-a-player mode, as well as an improved, 15-season-long career mode. The game's biggest difference compared to previous titles was the inclusion of first-touch gameplay which provided gamers the ability to perform real-life tricks and passes. It was also the first version to feature the full Mexican League, which boosted sales in the United States.  The soundtrack was headlined by British DJ Paul Oakenfold, who composed the "FIFA Theme" especially for the game. The soundtrack was Faithless, Ivete Sangalo, JoJo, Marcelo D2, Oomph!, Scissor Sisters and Seeed.

The main cover for the game featured Patrick Vieira, Fernando Morientes and Andriy Shevchenko. On the North American cover Oswaldo Sánchez replaced Vieira.

John Motson provides commentary with Ally McCoist on special comments in the English version of the game.

In most territories, FIFA 2005 was the last game to release on the PlayStation console.

The game's online servers were closed in 2008.

Reception

According to Electronic Arts, FIFA Football 2005 sold above 4.5 million units worldwide by the end of 2004.

While it  had inferior gameplay to Konami's series, it was acknowledged to have improved significantly since the 2003 edition.

The PlayStation 2 version of FIFA Football 2005 received a "Double Platinum" sales award from the Entertainment and Leisure Software Publishers Association (ELSPA), indicating sales of at least 600,000 copies in the United Kingdom.

The game was met with positive to average reception.  GameRankings and Metacritic gave it a score of 85.33% for the Mobile version; 82.07% and 81 out of 100 for the Xbox version; 82% and 75 out of 100 for the Game Boy Advance version; 81.46% and 81 out of 100 for the PlayStation 2 version; 80.99% and 78 out of 100 for the GameCube version; 78.25% and 77 out of 100 for the PC version; 77.90% and 79 out of 100 for the N-Gage version; and 74.36% and 73 out of 100 for the PSP version.

GameSpot gave the Mobile version a score of 8.4 out of 10 and said, "It doesn't supersede the console versions in any way, but the fact that it comes reasonably close says a lot about the quality of this game as well as about how far mobile gaming has come along." IGN gave the same version 7.5 out of 10 and called it "unnecessarily hard". It received a runner-up placement in GameSpots 2004 "Best N-Gage Game" award category, losing to Colin McRae Rally 2005.

References

External links
Official site 

2004 video games
Electronic Arts games
EA Sports games
Esports games
2005
Game Boy Advance games
GameCube games
Gizmondo games
Mobile games
N-Gage games
PlayStation (console) games
PlayStation 2 games
PlayStation Portable games
Video games developed in Canada
Windows games
Xbox games
Video games set in 2004
Video games set in 2005
La Liga licensed video games
Multiplayer and single-player video games